Glanville is a commune in the Calvados department in the Normandy region in northwestern France.  Its postal code is 14950.

Glandevilla 1079 in a Latin written document. Male Germanic name Glando and old French ville "farm".

The de Glanville family was from this village.

Population

Sights
The Villa Sayer (1975) is the only house built by the great architect Marcel Breuer in France.

See also
Communes of the Calvados department

References

Communes of Calvados (department)
Calvados communes articles needing translation from French Wikipedia